Australia participated in the Junior Eurovision Song Contest five times between  and . SBS previously broadcast every edition of the Junior Eurovision Song Contest on a delay.

The first representative to participate for the nation at the 2015 contest was Bella Paige with the song "My Girls", which finished in eighth place out of seventeen participating entries, achieving a score of sixty-four points. Australia continued their participation at the 2016 contest, having internally selected Alexa Curtis with her song "We Are", which finished in fifth place, scoring 202 points. Isabella Clarke in 2017 and Jael Wena in 2018 both placed 3rd, Australia's best results to date. After finishing eighth with Jordan Anthony in 2019, Australia announced their withdrawal from the 2020 contest due to the COVID-19 pandemic. The country has not returned to the contest since.

History

On 7 October 2015, the Australian national broadcaster Special Broadcasting Service (SBS) announced that they would be making their Junior Eurovision debut at the  contest, in Sofia, Bulgaria, following on from their success at the Eurovision Song Contest 2015. SBS internally selected Bella Paige as their debut representative, with the song "My Girls". At the running order draw which took place on 15 November 2015, Australia were drawn to perform sixth on 21 November 2015, following  and preceding , where she finished in eighth place scoring 64 points. This is Australia's worst result in their contest history. It was achieved again at the 2019 contest in Gliwice, Poland.

Alexa Curtis was announced on 29 September 2016 as being their participant, and would represent Australia with the song "We Are". During the opening ceremony and the running order draw which took place on 14 November 2016, Australia was drawn to perform fourteenth on 20 November 2016, following Israel and preceding the Netherlands, where she finished in fifth place achieving 202 points, their best result at the time until Isabella Clarke's participation of the 2017 edition and Jael (2018 Junior Eurovision Song Contest) both being placed 3rd place overall.

In July 2020, Australian broadcaster SBS announced that they would not participate in the 2020 contest due to the COVID-19 pandemic. The country has not returned to the contest since.

Participation overview

Commentators and spokespersons

The contest  are broadcast online worldwide through the official Junior Eurovision Song Contest website junioreurovision.tv and YouTube. In 2015, the online broadcasts featured commentary in English by junioreurovision.tv editor Luke Fisher and 2011 Bulgarian Junior Eurovision Song Contest entrant Ivan Ivanov. The Australian broadcaster send their own commentary team to each contest in order to provide commentary in the English language. Spokespersons were also chosen by the national broadcaster in order to announce the awarding points from Australia. The table below list the details of each commentator and spokesperson since 2003.

See also
 Australia in the ABU Radio Song Festival – Radio event organised by the Asia-Pacific Broadcasting Union (ABU).
 Australia in the ABU TV Song Festival – Television event organised by the ABU.
 Australia in the Eurovision Song Contest – Senior version of the Junior Eurovision Song Contest.

References 

Countries in the Junior Eurovision Song Contest
Australian music